Jeanne d'Arc was a wooden-hulled armored corvette built for the French Navy in the late 1860s. She was named for Joan of Arc, a Roman Catholic saint and heroine of the Hundred Years War. Jeanne d'Arc participated in the Franco-Prussian War of 1870–1871 and remained in commission afterwards, unlike many of her sisters. The ship was condemned in 1883, but nothing further is known as to her disposition.

Design and description
The s were designed as improved versions of the armored corvette  suitable for foreign deployments. Unlike their predecessor the Alma-class ships were true central battery ironclads as they were fitted with armored transverse bulkheads. Like most ironclads of their era they were equipped with a metal-reinforced ram.

Her crew numbered 316 officers and men.

Propulsion
The ship had a single horizontal return connecting-rod steam engine driving a single propeller. Her engine was powered by four oval boilers. On sea trials the engine produced  and the ship reached . Unlike all of her sisters except , she had two funnels, mounted side by side.

Armament
Jeanne d'Arc mounted four of her  Modèle 1864 breech-loading guns in the central battery on the battery deck. The other two 194-millimeter guns were mounted in barbettes on the upper deck, sponsoned out over the sides of the ship. The four  guns were also mounted on the upper deck. She may have exchanged her Mle 1864 guns for Mle 1870 guns. The guns could fire both solid shot and explosive shells.

Armor
The unarmored portions of her sides were protected by  iron plates.

Service
Jeanne d'Arc was laid down at Cherbourg in 1865 and launched on 28 September 1867. The ship began her sea trials on 9 March 1868 and was put into reserve at Brest in 1869. She was commissioned on 12 April 1870, shortly before the Franco-Prussian War began, and assigned to the Northern Squadron. On 24 July 1870 she departed Cherbourg in company with the rest of the Northern Squadron and they cruised off the Danish port of Frederikshavn between 28 July and 2 August until they entered the Baltic Sea. The squadron, now renamed the Baltic Squadron, remained in the Baltic, attempting to blockade Prussian ports on the Baltic until ordered to return to Cherbourg on 16 September. On 1 August 1873 Jeanne d'Arc was in Málaga, Spain and departed later that day bound for Cadiz.

On 21 July 1875, Jeanne d'Arc was participating in a naval exercise involving six ironclads – the broadside ironclad , operating as the flagship, and five  central battery ironclads including Jeanne d′Arc – and a number of smaller ships in the Tyrrhenian Sea off the east coast of Corsica . Attempting to place his ship in the column between Magenta and Jeanne d′Arc, the commanding officer of Forfait misjudged his turn, and Jeanne d′Arc collided with Forfait. The impact was barely noticeable aboard Jeanne d′Arc, but her ram bow tore into Forfaits side. Forfait sank 14 minutes later, her crew of 160 taking safely to her boats; her commanding officer floated free from the bridge as Forfait sank beneath him, but also was rescued.

On 3 December 1875, Jeanne d′Arc became the flagship of Rear Admiral Bonie, but she was placed in reserve on 1 January 1876 at Brest, France. Jeanne d'Arc was recommissioned on 12 April 1879 for service with the Levant Squadron. She was condemned on 28 August 1883 and nothing further is known of her fate.

Notes

Footnotes

References
 

 
 

Ships built in France
Alma-class ironclads
1867 ships
Maritime incidents in July 1875